Parectopa bosquella is a moth of the family Gracillariidae. It is known from the US state of Texas. It was described by Vactor Tousey Chambers in 1876.

References

Gracillariinae